Charlemont was a constituency represented in the Irish House of Commons, the house of representatives of the Kingdom of Ireland, from 1613 to 1800.

It represented Charlemont, County Armagh, an important military post since the founding of Charlemont Fort in 1602.

History
In the Patriot Parliament of 1689 summoned by James II, Charlemont was not represented. It was disenfranchised under the Acts of Union 1800.

Members of Parliament, 1613–1801
1613–1315 Sir Edward Moore and Faithful Fortescue
1634–1635 Chichester Fortescue and Hon Arthur Moore
1639–1649 John Marten and Henry Brome
1661–1666 Thomas Caulfeild and Thomas Howard (died and replaced 1665 by Sir Michael Appelyard)

1689–1801

Notes

References

Bibliography

Constituencies of the Parliament of Ireland (pre-1801)
Historic constituencies in County Armagh
1613 establishments in Ireland
1800 disestablishments in Ireland
Constituencies established in 1613
Constituencies disestablished in 1800